The M279 is a twin-turbocharged V12 engine produced by Mercedes-Benz. It was launched in 2012 with the R231 SL65 AMG.

Design 
The M279 is based on the previous generation M275 engine, but has been extensively revised. It now features port injection, larger turbochargers, changes to the valvetrain timing, and a new exhaust system for improved efficiency and emissions. The M279 also uses single overhead camshafts with 3 valves per cylinder, and has an identical bore and stroke compared to before.

Models

M279 E60 LA (390 kW version) 
 2014–2019 S 600L (V222)
 2015–2017 Mercedes-Maybach S 600 (X222)
 2016–2018 Maybach S 600 Pullman (VV222)

M279 E60 LA (450 kW version) 
 2012–2015 G 65 AMG (W463)
 2021–present Mercedes-Maybach S 680 4MATIC

M279 E60 LA (463 kW version) 
 2012–2018 SL 65 AMG (R231)
 2014–2019 S 65 AMG (W222)
 2014–2019 S 65 AMG Coupé (C217)
 2014–2019 S 65 AMG L (V222)
 2014–2018 G 65 AMG (W463)
 2016–2019 S 65 AMG Cabriolet (A217)
 2017–2019 Maybach S 650, S 680 (X222)
 2018–2019 Maybach S 650 Pullman, S 680 Pullman (VV222)

References 

Mercedes-Benz engines
V12 engines
Gasoline engines by model